Heggunda is a village in the southern state of Karnataka, India. It is located in the Nelamangala taluk of Bangalore Rural district.

Demographics 
Heggunda had population of 2,079 of which 1,049 are males while 1,030 are females as per report released by Census India 2011.

Geography 
The total geographical area of village is 490.72 hectares.

Bus Route from Bengaluru City 
Yeshwantapura - Darasahalli - Nelamangala

See also 

 Dasenahalli
 Bengaluru Rural District

References

External links 

Villages in Bangalore Rural district